The St. Louis Board of Aldermen is the lawmaking body of St. Louis, an independent city in the U.S. state of Missouri. It consists of 28 aldermen who are each elected from one of the city's wards. The President of the Board of Aldermen is a separate position that is elected citywide, has the same voting power as the aldermen, and serves as the body's presiding officer.

Aldermen may introduce legislation known as board bills, which are subject to approval by the mayor if passed by the Board. The Board is responsible for setting the city budget and conducting oversight of city departments and agencies.

The Board meets in the north wing of City Hall, located in the Downtown West neighborhood. Regular elections to the Board of Aldermen are held in the spring of odd-numbered years.  Beginning with the 2023 elections, the Board of Aldermen will be reduced from 28 members to 14.

Composition
The Board of Aldermen consists of one representative from each of the city's 28 wards (or 14 in 2023).  The body's President is elected separately by a citywide ballot.  Like the mayor, Aldermen representing odd-numbered wards are elected in odd numbered years following the United States Presidential Election, while the President of the Board and the Aldermen from even-numbered wards are elected in the off-years.  All Aldermen serve terms are four years.

Proposition R (2012) 
Proposition R (2012) was a charter amendment passed in November 2012 to reduce the number of city of St. Louis alderpersons from 28 to 14.  It was slated to take place 10 years in the future (effective January 1, 2022) and was passed by city voters on November 6, 2012 with 61 percent voting in favor (60 percent was needed for passage).

Proposition D (2020) 
Proposition D, a ballot measure to make municipal elections in St. Louis officially non-partisan, was passed by city voters on November 3, 2020 with 68 percent voting in favor.

Proposition R (2022) 
Proposition R (2022) called for an independent commission to draw boundaries between the wards of St. Louis, and ensured that that the board was not able to change the election method without a public vote.

Powers
By custom and tradition, an alderman has a great deal of influence over decisions impacting the ward they represent on matters ranging from zoning changes, to street resurfacing, to tax abatement to business licensing, etc.

By city charter, aldermen are legislators. Aldermen introduce laws and legislation known as board bills that can become city ordinances which can impact the quality of lives of city residents.

Committees
The Board of Aldermen uses committees for a variety of purposes, including the review of board bills or proposed laws, and the oversight of the city's executive and administrative branch The appointment of committee members is formally made by the President, while committee chairmanship is determined by seniority. Committee Chairman preside over committee meetings and hearings. Traditionally, five committees are considered to be the most powerful and most influential; Ways & Means; Public Safety; Housing, Urban Development & Zoning; Streets & Traffic; and Transportation & Commerce. Each alderperson sits on at least three standing committees. The Board has the following standing committees: 
 Committee on Ways & Means, Alderwoman Marlene Davis, Chair
 Committee on Public Safety, Alderman Joe Vaccaro, Chair
 Committee on Housing, Urban Development, & Zoning (HUDZ), Alderman Jack Coatar, Vice Chair
 Committee on Streets & Traffic, Alderwoman Sharon Tyus, Chair
 Committee on Transportation & Commerce, Alderman Shane Cohn, Chair
 Committee on Neighborhood Development, Alderwoman Carol Howard, Chair
 Committee on Public Utilities, Alderman Tom Oldenburg, Chair
 Committee on Public Employees, Alderman Brandon Bosley, Chair
 Committee on Intergovernmental Affairs, Alderwoman Cara Spencer, Chair
 Committee on Legislation, Alderman Joe Vollmer, Chair
 Committee on Parks & Environment, Alderwoman Pamela Boyd, Chair
 Committee on Health & Humans Services, Alderwoman Christine Ingrassia, Chair
 Committee on Education & Youth Issues, Alderwoman Megan Green, Chair

Qualifications
To become an alderman one must be a registered voter, twenty-five years of age, have been a United States citizen for at least five years, a resident of the city, and for one year a resident of the ward from which elected. The President must be at least thirty years of age and a city resident for at least five years.

Current members

List of presidents
The president presides at all the meeting, preserves decorum and determines all questions of order. The president appoints standing and special committees and serves as an equal member of all committees. The president assigns bills to appropriate committees and refers bills, when ready, to the Engrossment Committee. The president directs action from the broad elevated podium in the front and center of the semi-circulate position.

Party composition

Notes

References

External links
 Board of Aldermen of the City of St. Louis

Government of St. Louis
Missouri city councils